The year 2008 is the first year in the history of Ultimate Challenge MMA, a mixed martial arts promotion based in the United Kingdom. In 2008 Ultimate Challenge MMA held 1 event, UCMMA 1: Bad Breed.

Events list

UCMMA 1: Bad Breed

UCMMA 1: Bad Breed was an event held on 6 December 2008 at The Troxy in London, England, United Kingdom.

Results

See also 
 Ultimate Challenge MMA

References

Ultimate Challenge MMA events
2008 in mixed martial arts